The Holocaust teaching hoax was a hoax perpetrated in Great Britain in 2007. It involved sensationalist claims, mainly circulated in a chain email, which purported that the teaching of the Holocaust had been banned in British schools in fear of offending Muslim pupils. These claims were false, but inspired by a reported event at a school in Northern England, in which a teacher avoided teaching the holocaust as an optional topic.

The emails alleged that the ban had been put in place because of concerns that such teaching could "offend" Muslim pupils, claiming that "the Muslim population" denied the Holocaust. On 2 April 2007, the Daily Mail and The Guardian ran stories on the subject. The emails led some to contact the BBC to verify the claims, as teaching the Holocaust is mandatory in English state schools—except in academies—and has not been banned elsewhere in the United Kingdom.

In 2008, as email messages continued to circulate, the British government Schools Secretary Ed Balls wrote to the UK's embassies and the world media in order to refute the allegation that schools had banned or were reluctant to teach about the Holocaust.

Origin
The emails were based upon a wide-ranging report which the Department for Education and Skills commissioned from the Historical Association, a group which promotes the study of history. This report suggested that teachers may avoid emotive and controversial periods of history, but did not recommend that they do. The report went on to give an example of a school in "a northern city" in which a history teacher had recently avoided selecting the Holocaust as an optional topic for GCSE coursework for fear of confronting anti-Semitic sentiment and Holocaust denial among some Muslim pupils. It was also noted that, in another school, the Holocaust had been taught in spite of "anti-Semitic sentiment among some pupils" but that study of the Crusades had been avoided because of the contrast to the stories with which Muslim pupils were raised. In no case was it suggested that avoiding causing offence to Holocaust deniers should be an aim.

See also
 Holocaust Educational Trust
 Holocaust denial

References

External links

Holocaust historiography
Islam-related controversies in Europe
Hoaxes in the United Kingdom
Internet hoaxes
2007 in the United Kingdom
2007 hoaxes
The Holocaust and the United Kingdom
2007 in education